On December 21, 2015, in Bagram, a suicide bomber blew himself up, killing six NATO service members.

Victims
All six of the members killed were of American nationality.

2015-12-21, Special Agent Adrianna M. Vorderbruggen[897], U.S. Air Force Office of Special Investigations, US Bomb
2015-12-21, Special Agent Michael A. Cinco[898], U.S. Air Force Office of Special Investigations, US Bomb
2015-12-21, Special Agent Peter W. Taub[899], U.S. Air Force Office of Special Investigations, US Bomb
2015-12-21, Special Agent Chester J. McBride[900], U.S. Air Force Office of Special Investigations, US	Bomb
2015-12-21, Technical Sergeant Joseph G. Lemm[901], U.S. Air Force Security Forces, US Bomb
2015-12-21, Staff Sergeant Louis M. Bonocasa[902], U.S. Air Force Security Forces, US Bomb

Zabiullah Mujahid, the spokesperson for the Taliban, claimed they were responsible for the attack via Twitter and e-mail.

Attack
A suicide bomber riding a motorcycle loaded with explosives crashed into a NATO-Afghanistan foot patrol while it was traveling throughout the village near Bagram Air Base. Six American NATO service members were killed with two other Americans and an Afghani injured.

Reactions
U.S. Secretary of Defense Ash Carter responded to the bombing, stating, "our troops are working diligently alongside our Afghan partners to build a brighter future for the Afghan people. Their dedicated efforts will continue despite this tragic event. Our deepest sympathies go out to the families of these brave Americans who died in service to this vital mission, and our thoughts remain with all of our troops serving overseas during this holiday season so that we may have peace and security at home."

White House Office of the Press Secretary  issued a statement, stating "we express our deepest condolences to the families of the six U.S. service members killed and to all of those injured in today’s Taliban attack near Bagram Airfield in Afghanistan. Our thoughts and prayers are with the victims, their families, and their loved ones. The United States condemns this cowardly attack on members of the U.S. and Afghan forces, and we remain committed to supporting the Afghan people and their government. We will continue to work together to promote peace and stability in Afghanistan, just as we will not relent in our mission to counter the threat of terrorism that plagues the region."

See also
 Air Force Office of Special Investigations
 United States Air Force Security Forces
 2007 Bagram Airfield bombing
 2014 Bagram Airfield bombing
 2016 Bagram Airfield bombing

References

2015 murders in Afghanistan
Mass murder in 2015
Suicide bombings in 2015
Terrorist incidents in Afghanistan in 2015
Suicide bombings in Afghanistan
December 2015 events in Afghanistan
Parwan Province